The 101st Independent Brigade of the Territorial Defense Forces is a military formation of the Territorial Defense Forces of Ukraine in Zakarpattia Oblast. It is part of Operational Command West.

History

Formation 
In 2018 in Zakarpattia Oblast Brigade was formed. From 19 to 28 September 2019 Brigade held large scale exercise for over 2,000 reservists.

Russo-Ukrainian War

2022 Russian invasion of Ukraine
Units of the Brigade served in defence of Popasna in April. Then defended Hirske, Serhiivka, Volodymyrivka and Spirne. Some troops Soldiers from Brigade were serving in Sumy Oblast and Kharkiv Oblast in December.

Structure 
As of 2022 the brigade's structure is as follows:
 Headquarters
 68th Territorial Defense Battalion (Uzhhorod) А7080
 69th Territorial Defense Battalion (Rakhiv) А7081
 70th Territorial Defense Battalion (Mukachevo) А7084
 71st Territorial Defense Battalion (Tiachiv) А7123
 72nd Territorial Defense Battalion (Khust) А7124
 73rd Territorial Defense Battalion (Berehove) А7124
 212th Territorial Defense Battalion (Uzhhorod) А7369
 Counter-Sabotage Company
 Engineering Company
 Communication Company
 Logistics Company
 Mortar Battery

Commanders 
 Colonel Nahaiko Viktor 2018 - 2019
 Colonel Zavorotniuk Dmytro 2022 - present

See also 
 Territorial Defense Forces of the Armed Forces of Ukraine

References 

Territorial defense Brigades of Ukraine
2018 establishments in Ukraine
Military units and formations established in 2018